Spring Fools is the follow-up to Matt Pond PA's eighth studio album The Dark Leaves. It was released on April 26, 2011.

Track listing
 "Love to Get Used" – 3:34
 "Human Beings" – 4:03
 "Lovers Always Win" – 3:11
 "Spring Fawn" – 5:20
 "Sugar Bush" – 4:32

External links
Matt Pond PA - Spring Fools EP by Alternative Press	
	
 

2011 EPs
Matt Pond PA EPs